Takht-e Goru (also Romanized as Takht-e Gorū; also known as Takhteh Gorūh) is a village in Kukherd Rural District, Kukherd District, Bastak County, Hormozgan Province, Iran. At the 2006 census, its population was 153, in 30 families.

References

External links 

  Kookherd Website.

Populated places in Bastak County
Kukherd District